Vysokaya is a rural locality (a village) in Mityukovskoye Rural Settlement, Vozhegodsky District, Vologda Oblast, Russia. The population was 51 as of 2002.

Geography 
Vysokaya is located 70 km southeast of Vozhega (the district's administrative centre) by road. Gridinskaya is the nearest rural locality.

References 

Rural localities in Vozhegodsky District